Operation Star or Operation Zvezda was a Red Army offensive on the Eastern Front of World War II begun on 2 February 1943. The attack was the responsibility of the Voronezh Front under the command of Filipp Golikov and a part of the larger Voronezh-Kharkov Strategic Offensive Operation. 

Its main objectives were the cities of Kharkov and Kursk. While initially successful in capturing both cities, the Soviets overextended themselves, allowing German field marshal Erich von Manstein to launch a counteroffensive and inflict a defeat on the Soviets in the Third Battle of Kharkov.

See also
 Case Blue
 Operation Gallop

References

Battles and operations of World War II
Battles and operations of the Soviet–German War
Battles of World War II involving Germany
Battles involving the Soviet Union
Strategic operations of the Red Army in World War II
Military operations of World War II involving Germany